Perfect mixing is a term heavily used in relation to the definition of models that predict the behavior of chemical reactors. Perfect mixing assumes that there are no spatial gradients in a given physical envelope, such as:

 concentration (with respect to any chemical species)
 temperature
 chemical potential
 catalytic activity

Physical chemistry